Pariyapuram  is a village in Malappuram district in the state of Kerala, India. The village was part of the Kingdom of Tanur (Vettattnad) kingdom in medieval times.

Demographics
, Pariyapuram had a population of 22,766 with 11,102 males and 11,664 females.

Transportation
The nearest airport is at Kozhikode.  The nearest major railway station is at Parappanangadi.

References

Villages in Malappuram district
Parappanangadi area